Erra is a small borough in Lüganuse Parish, Ida-Viru County, in northeastern Estonia. As of 2011 Census, the settlement's population was 130.

References

Boroughs and small boroughs in Estonia
Lüganuse Parish